Heer may refer to:

People 
 Jeet Heer, Indo-Canadian author and journalist
 Jeffrey Heer (born 1979), American computer scientist and entrepreneur
 Kamal Heer (born 1973), Indian singer and musician of Punjabi music
 Oswald Heer (1809–1883), Swiss botanist and naturalist with the standard botanical author abbreviation Heer
 Manmohan Waris or Manmohan Heer (born 1970), Indian singer and musician of Punjabi music
 Sangtar or Sangtar Heer (born 1973), Indian composer and musician of Punjabi music

Other meanings 
 Heer (1955 film), a 1955 Pakistani film
 "Heer" (instrumental), a 1991 instrumental by Pakistani band Junoon
 Heer, Netherlands, an area in the municipality of Maastricht, Limburg
 Heer (army)
 "Heeriye", song from the 2020 Indian romantic film Happy Hardy and Heer

See also
 Heer Ranjha (disambiguation)
 Heer Sial (disambiguation)